14 Aquarii (abbreviated 14 Aqr) is red giant star. 14 Aquarii is the Flamsteed designation; it also bears the variable star designation IW Aquarii. It is a semiregular variable with an amplitude of a tenth of a magnitude, and shows variations on a timescale of just one day.

References

External links
 Image HD 202466

Aquarius (constellation)
Semiregular variable stars
Aquarii, 014
202466
Aquarii, IW
BD-09 5700
105019
M-type giants